Alida Carmen Cioroianu Marcovici (born ) is a retired Romanian female volleyball player. She was part of the Romania women's national volleyball team.

She participated at the 1994 FIVB Volleyball Women's World Championship in Brazil. On club level she played with Universitatea Craiova (1994).

References

External links

1973 births
Living people
Romanian women's volleyball players
Place of birth missing (living people)